MV Princess of Vancouver was a passenger vessel in the Pacific coastal service fleet of the Canadian Pacific Railway (CPR).

The ship was part of the CPR Princess fleet, which was composed of ships having names which began with the title "Princess".

History
In 1955, Princess of Vancouver was added to the CPR fleet; and she would become the last remnant of the once famous coastal fleet in service. In 1981, sold to the BC Ministry of Transportation & Highways saltwater ferries. She was subsequently converted to a RORO ferry by Burrard Yarrows for $8,995,000 and in 1982 she was placed in service between Little River (Comox) and Powell River.

On 10 October 1985 she was registered as Princess of Vancouver for the British Columbia Ferry Corporation and operated between Comox, British Columbia and Powell River, British Columbia, and from 1987 between Seattle and Victoria as "Vancouver Island Princess".

In 1993 she was sold to China and renamed  Nan Hai Ming Zhu. In 2001 she was sold to Haveton Shipping, Hong Kong and renamed Pearl of South China Sea.  In 2007 she was listed as in active service.

Princess of Vancouver pioneered a series of diesel engine innovations that made possible the use of heavy fuel oil in medium speed trunk piston engines.

Notes

References
 Jackman, Sydney Wayne. (1972). Vancouver Island. Newton Abbot, UK: David & Charles. ;  OCLC 348243

External links
Princess of Vancouver leaving Nanaimo Harbour in 1969

Ships of CP Ships
1955 ships
Ships built on the River Clyde
Ships of BC Ferries